Kingdom Records is a British record label from the 1970s and 1980s, that was important in early British and Jamaican dub music. The label was founded by founded by Terry King. One of Kingdom Records' first releases was the 1972 Mojo Hannah single "Six Days on the Road".

Kingdom Jazz is a sub-label of Kingdom Records. Kingdom Jazz uses the catalogue prefix GATE, for example: GATE 7003.

Artists 
Artists who have recorded with Kingdom Records or Kingdom Jazz include:

 Ahmad JamalJ
 Angel Witch
 Art BlakeyJ
 B.B. King
 B.B. KingJ
 Barrington Levy
 Buddy RichJ
 Caravan
 Carmen McRaeJ
 Charlie MingusJ
 Chick CoreaJ
 Culture
 Don Carlos and Gold
 Eddie "Lockjaw" DavisJ
 Gary BurtonJ
 Gayle MoranJ
 Gerry MulliganJ
 Gregory Isaacs
 Joe FarrellJ
 Johnny GriffinJ
 Lionel HamptonJ
 McCoy TynerJ
 Mike GarsonJ
 Mojo Hannah
 Nicholas Greenwood
 Pat MethenyJ
 Paul HornJ
 Pulsar
 Revelation
 Scientist
 Simple Simon
 Sonny StittJ
 Stan GetzJ
 Sugar BlueJ
 The Dave Brubeck QuartetJ
 The Heath BrothersJ
 The Royals
 Wayne Gibson
 Woody ShawJ
 Wynton MarsalisJ

Notes

External links
Discogs directory page for Kingdom Records
Discogs database for music on vinyl, CD, cassette, mp3

British record labels